Lankford is a surname. Notable people with the surname include:

James Lankford (born 1968), American politician
John A. Lankford (1874–1946), American architect
Kevin Lankford (born 1998), German-American soccer player 
Kim Lankford (born 1954), American businesswoman and actress
Kirk Lankford (born 1985), American murderer
Menalcus Lankford (1883–1937), American politician
Paul Lankford (born 1958), American football player
Ray Lankford (born 1967), American baseball player
Richard Estep Lankford (born 1914), American politician
Ryan Lankford (born 1991), Canadian football player
William Lankford (disambiguation)

See also 
Langford (surname)